Breitkopf may refer to:
 Bernhard Christoph Breitkopf, (1695-1777) founder of Breitkopf & Härtel
 Johann Gottlob Immanuel Breitkopf, (1719-1794) son of Bernhard Cristoph Breitkopf
 Michael Breitkopf, member of German band Die Toten Hosen
 Breitkopf & Härtel, a German music publishing house